Rachel Trickett (20 December 1923 – 24 June 1999) was an English novelist, non‑fiction writer, literary scholar, and a prominent British academic; she served as Principal of St Hugh's College, Oxford, for nearly twenty years, between 1973 and 1991.

Education
Trickett was educated at Lady Margaret Hall, Oxford. She became a lecturer in English at the University of Hull in 1946 and in 1954 she returned to Oxford as a fellow and tutor at St Hugh's College.

Principal of St. Hugh's College
As Principal of St. Hugh's College, Trickett often showed a side of gaiety: on her instruction, the chapel at the college was redecorated in 18th-century colours. Her friend Laurence Whistler designed the college's beautiful gilded wrought iron Swan gates, which can now be found by the Principal's house on Canterbury Road.

Other work
Trickett was the author of the novel The Return Home (London, Constable & Co., 1952), and of The Course of Love (London, Constable & Co., 1954).  Her The Honest Muse: A Study in Augustan Verse was published by Clarendon Press, Oxford, in 1967.

It is said that "she had a wicked eye for the conceit of academics, their insularity and devious manipulations", an attitude which made her a soul‑mate of Erich Heller.

Legacy
The Rachel Trickett Building at St. Hugh's College is named in her honour.

References

Bibliography
 Gearin-Tosh, Michael (2002) Living Proof: a medical mutiny. 

 

 
 

1923 births
1999 deaths
British non-fiction writers
John Llewellyn Rhys Prize winners
Fellows of St Hugh's College, Oxford
Alumni of Lady Margaret Hall, Oxford
Academics of the University of Hull
Principals of St Hugh's College, Oxford
English women novelists
20th-century English women writers
20th-century English writers
20th-century British novelists
20th-century non-fiction writers